The Pensions Act 2004 (c 35) is an Act of the Parliament of the United Kingdom to improve the running of pension schemes.

Background
In the years following the introduction of the Pensions Act 1995, it was widely perceived that it was failing to offer the protection to pension scheme members that had been anticipated.  The Occupational Pensions Regulatory Authority was perceived as being reactive, didactic and uncommercial. The minimum funding requirement had not prevented some pension schemes winding up with insufficient assets to secure their liabilities, amid considerable publicity.  There was strong political pressure to establish a guarantee fund similar to the American Pension Benefit Guaranty Corporation. Much of the regulation was perceived to be unnecessarily restrictive.  The Pensions Act 2004 was written to try to fix these deficiences. The Act introduced two new regulatory institutions: the Pensions Regulator, with the powers to require sponsoring companies to make contributions to ensure that scheme funding objectives are met; and the Pension Protection Fund, which would inherit the pension liabilities of a pension scheme in the event that a sponsoring company becomes insolvent.

In assessing the consequences of the Act, there is evidence that corporate dividend and investment sensitivities to pension contributions were more pronounced in and after 2005, indicating that the regulations imposed by the Act had a significant effect on corporate expenditures.

Overview
The main features of the Act include:

 The abolition of the Occupational Pensions Regulatory Authority and its replacement by the Pensions Regulator, with wider powers to intervene of its own volition;
 New powers for the Pensions Regulator to intervene where employers, directors and majority shareholders were perceived to be avoiding their responsibilities to pension schemes and where employers were insufficiently resourced to support the pension scheme;
 New notification requirements;
 The establishment of the Pension Protection Fund to provide benefits for pension scheme members where a pension scheme had gone into winding-up with insufficient resources to fund scheme benefits and no employer to make good the underfunding;
 The abolition of the minimum funding requirement and its replacement with scheme-specific funding requirements; 
 Modification of the protections for existing pension scheme benefits and of the requirements for pension schemes to have member nominated trustees.

Contents
Part 1, The Pensions Regulator, ss 1-106
Part 2, The Board of the Pension Protection Fund, ss 107-220
Part 3, Scheme Funding ss 221-233
Part 4, Financial Planning for Retirement, ss 234-238
Part 5, Occupational and Personal Pension Schemes: Miscellaneous Provisions, ss 239-285
Part 6, Financial Assistance Scheme for Members of Certain Pension Schemes, s 286
Part 7, Cross-border Activities within European Union, ss 287-295
Part 8, State Pensions, s 296-299
Part 9, Miscellaneous and Supplementary, ss 300-325

Schedules
Schedule 1, The Pensions Regulator
Schedule 2, The reserved regulatory functions
Schedule 3, Restricted information held by the Regulator: certain permitted disclosures to facilitate exercise of functions
Schedule 4, The Pensions Regulator Tribunal
Schedule 5, The Board of the Pension Protection Fund
Schedule 6, Transfer of property, rights and liabilities to the Board
Schedule 7, Pension compensation provisions
Schedule 8, Restricted information held by the Board: certain permitted disclosures to facilitate exercise of functions
Schedule 9, Reviewable matters
Schedule 10, Use and supply of information: private pensions policy and retirement planning
Schedule 11, Deferral of retirement pensions and shared additional pensions
Schedule 12, Minor and consequential amendments
Schedule 13, Repeals and revocations

See also
UK labour law
Pensions in the United Kingdom
Pensions Act 1995

Notes

External links
Association of Member-Directed Pension Schemes (AMPS) - The principal body for discussing changes involved in the area of pension planning.

Pensions in the United Kingdom
United Kingdom Acts of Parliament 2004